The black-backed thornbill (Ramphomicron dorsale) is an Endangered species of hummingbird in the "coquettes", tribe Lesbiini of subfamily Lesbiinae. It is endemic to the Sierra Nevada de Santa Marta of northern Colombia.

Taxonomy and systematics

The black-backed thornbill is monotypic. It shares its genus with the purple-backed thornbill (R. microrhynchum).

Description

Both sexes have a very short black bill; the male's is slightly decurved. The male's upperparts are velvety black with purplish uppertail coverts and a white spot behind the eye. Their gorget is olive green and the rest of the underparts are a mix of dark gray and rufous with green dots. The tail is moderately long, deeply forked, and purplish black. Females have shining grass green upperparts, and like the male, purplish uppertail coverts and a white spot behind the eye. Their underparts are buffy white with green dots. The tail is shorter than the male's and the outer pair of feathers have white tips.

Distribution and habitat

The black-backed thornbill is restricted to the isolated Sierra Nevada de Santa Marta in far northern Colombia, where it inhabits the edges of humid and elfin forest and also páramo.

Behavior

Movement

The black-backed thornbill moves to lower elevations in May and Jun.

Feeding

The black-backed thornbill forages for nectar at any height from the ground to the canopy. It has been recorded taking nectar from the flowers of Ericaceae, Lobeliaceae, Melastomataceae, and Rubiaceae, and more specifically flowers of genera Erythrina, Puya, and Salvia. It collects nectar while hovering and also by clinging to the flower. In addition it feeds on insects caught on the wing and gleaned from flowers.

Breeding

Nothing is known about the black-backed thornbill's breeding phenology.

Vocalization

The black-backed thornbill's calls include "a short dry rattle 'trrr'...a long descending rattle...'tsee-tttrrrrrrrr-tsee', [and] single 'tsee' notes."

Status

The IUCN has assessed the black-backed thornbill as Endangered. It has a very limited range; its population size is not known and is believed to be decreasing. Its habitat is under severe human pressure for conversion to agriculture and grazing. A small part of its range is protected in a national park.

References

black-backed thornbill
Birds of the Sierra Nevada de Santa Marta
Endemic birds of Colombia
black-backed thornbill
black-backed thornbill
black-backed thornbill
Taxonomy articles created by Polbot